Zur Hölle mit den Paukern is a 1968 West German comedy film directed by Werner Jacobs and starring Hans Kraus, Theo Lingen and Günther Schramm. It was the first entry into the seven part Die Lümmel von der ersten Bank series of comedy films.

Cast
 Hans Kraus: Pepe Nietnagel
 Theo Lingen: Oberstudiendirektor Dr. Gottlieb Taft
 Günther Schramm: Studienrat Dr. Albert Kersten
 Uschi Glas: Marion Nietnagel
 Gila von Weitershausen: Helena Taft
 Hannelore Elsner: Geneviève Ponelle
 Georg Thomalla: Kurt Nietnagel
 Rudolf Schündler: Oberstudienrat Prof. Dr. Arthur Knörz
 Hans Terofal: Pedell Georg Bloch
 Balduin Baas: Studienrat Dr. Blaumeier
 Oliver Hassencamp: Studienrat Priehl
 Monika Dahlberg: Fräulein Weidt, Sekretärin
 Ruth Stephan: Studienrätin Dr. Mathilde Pollhagen
 Wega Jahnke: Lydia Meier, Schülerin
 Ursula Grabley: Baronin, Freundin von Frau Nietnagel
 Ilse Petri: Frau Nietnagel
 Britt Lindberg: Susie Rixner
 Josef Coesfeld: Hotelportier
 Jürgen Drews: Schüler und Musiker
 Enrico Lombardi: Musiker
 Gerd Müller: Musiker
 Joachim Rake: Kultusminister
 Herbert Weißbach: Kommissionsleiter Brändle

References

External links

1968 films
1968 comedy films
German comedy films
West German films
1960s German-language films
Films directed by Werner Jacobs
Films about educators
1960s German films